Events in the year 1924 in Belgium.

Incumbents
Monarch – Albert I
Prime Minister – Georges Theunis

Events
 15 June – 13th Gordon Bennett Cup held in Brussels

Publications
 Willem Elsschot, Lijmen
 Félix Magnette, Précis d'histoire liégeoise

Art and architecture

Births
3 April – Jacky June, jazz musician (d. 2012)
23 May – Arnaud Fraiteur, resistance fighter (d. 1943)
26 October – Constantin Brodzki, architect (d. 2021)

Deaths
 29 May – Amedée Visart de Bocarmé (b. 1835), politician
 June 14 –  Emile Claus, Belgian painter (b. 1849)

References

 
1920s in Belgium
Belgium
Years of the 20th century in Belgium
Belgium